Ramcat Run is a  long 1st order tributary to the Youghiogheny River in Fayette County, Pennsylvania.

Course
Ramcat Run rises about 1.5 miles southeast of Sugar Loaf Knob, and then flows east to join the Youghiogheny River at Huston.

Watershed
Ramcat Run drains  of area, receives about 48.7 in/year of precipitation, has a wetness index of 350.74, and is about 94% forested.

See also
List of rivers of Pennsylvania

References

Tributaries of the Youghiogheny River
Rivers of Pennsylvania
Rivers of Fayette County, Pennsylvania